The following elections occurred in the year 1854.

North America

United States
 California's At-large congressional district
 1854 New York state election
 1854 and 1855 United States House of Representatives elections
 1854 and 1855 United States Senate elections

See also
 :Category:1854 elections

1854
Elections